This is a list of the municipalities of Sweden by average net wealth of its inhabitants in 2007 according to Statistics Sweden.

References

 
Municipalities, wealth
Municipalities, wealth
Sweden, Municipalities, wealth